Susheela is a 1963 Indian Malayalam-language film, directed by K. S. Sethumadhavan and produced by N. S. Dravyam. The film stars Prem Nazir, Sheela, Adoor Bhasi and Thikkurissy Sukumaran Nair. The film had musical score by V. Dakshinamoorthy.

Cast
Prem Nazir 
Sheela 
Adoor Bhasi 
Thikkurissy Sukumaran Nair 
Ambika 
Bahadoor 
Miss Kumari

Soundtrack
The music was composed by V. Dakshinamoorthy and the lyrics were written by P. Bhaskaran, Abhayadev and Vallathol.

References

External links
 

1963 films
1960s Malayalam-language films
Films directed by K. S. Sethumadhavan